Matt or Matthew Anderson may refer to:

Matt Anderson (baseball) (born 1976), Major League Baseball relief pitcher
Matthew Anderson (cricketer) (born 1976), Australian cricketer
Matt Anderson (ice hockey) (born 1982), American ice hockey player
Matt Anderson (volleyball) (born 1987), volleyball player
Matt Anderson (windsurfer) (born 1968), Puerto Rican windsurfer
Matthew Anderson (politician) (1822–1910), American politician
Matthew Tobin Anderson (born 1968), American author
Matthew Smith Anderson (1922–2006), professor of history
Matt Anderson (Primeval), played by Ciaran McMenamin, a fictional character in Primeval

See also
Matt Andersen, Canadian blues guitarist and singer-songwriter